Harold Osbaldestin (20 February 1909 – third ¼ 1955) was an English professional rugby league footballer who played in the 1920s and 1930s.

Background
Harold Osbaldestin was born in Whelley, Wigan, Lancashire, England, and he died aged 46 in Swinton, Lancashire, England.

Playing career

Les Diables Rouges
Osbaldestin was one of the players who successfully toured in France with Salford in 1934, during which the Salford team earned the name "Les Diables Rouges", the seventeen players were; Joe Bradbury, Bob Brown, Aubrey Casewell, Paddy Dalton, Bert Day, Cliff Evans, Jack Feetham, George Harris, Barney Hudson, Emlyn Jenkins, Alf Middleton, Sammy Miller, Osbaldestin, Les Pearson, Gus Risman, Billy Watkins and Billy Williams.

Championship final appearances
Osbaldestin played  in Salford's 3–15 defeat by Wigan in the Championship Final during the 1933–34 season at Wilderspool Stadium, Warrington on Saturday 28 April 1934.

Challenge Cup Final appearances
Osbaldestin played  in Salford's 7–4 victory over Barrow in the 1938 Challenge Cup Final during the 1937–38 season at Wembley Stadium, London, on Saturday 7 May 1938.

County Cup Final appearances
About Osbaldestin's time, there was Salford's 10–8 victory over Swinton in the 1931 Lancashire County Cup Final during the 1931–32 season at The Cliff, Broughton, Salford on Saturday 21 November 1931, the 21–12 victory over Wigan in the 1934 Lancashire County Cup Final during the 1934–35 season at Station Road, Swinton on Saturday 20 October 1934, the 15–7 victory over Wigan in the 1935 Lancashire County Cup Final during the 1935–36 season at Wilderspool Stadium, Warrington on Saturday 19 October 1935, the 5–2 victory over Wigan in the 1936 Lancashire County Cup Final during the 1936–37 season at Wilderspool Stadium, Warrington on Saturday 17 October 1936, and he played  in the 7–10 defeat by Wigan in the 1938 Lancashire County Cup Final during the 1938–39 season at Station Road, Swinton on Saturday 22 October 1938.

Genealogical information
Osbaldestin's marriage to Jane Ellen ('Nellie') (née Gregson) took place on Tuesday 27 December 1932 at St Stephen's Church, Whelley, Wigan.

References

External links

Search for "Osbaldestin" at rugbyleagueproject.org
Harold Osbaldestin's genealogical profile
(archived by web.archive.org) The Story So Far – 110 Years At The Willows – 1938

1909 births
1956 deaths
Dewsbury Rams players
English rugby league players
Liverpool City (rugby league) players
Rugby league fullbacks
Rugby league players from Wigan
Salford Red Devils players